Nick Yates is a retired male badminton player from England.

Badminton career
Yates represented England and won a gold medal in the team event and two silver medals in the singles and doubles, at the 1982 Commonwealth Games in Brisbane, Queensland, Australia.

Four years later he represented England again and won another gold medal in the team event in addition to a bronze medal in the singles, at the 1986 Commonwealth Games in Edinburgh, Scotland.

Achievements

IBF World Grand Prix 
The World Badminton Grand Prix sanctioned by International Badminton Federation (IBF) from 1983 to 2006.

Men's singles

Men's doubles

References

English male badminton players
Living people
Commonwealth Games medallists in badminton
Commonwealth Games gold medallists for England
Commonwealth Games silver medallists for England
Commonwealth Games bronze medallists for England
Badminton players at the 1982 Commonwealth Games
Badminton players at the 1986 Commonwealth Games
Year of birth missing (living people)
Medallists at the 1982 Commonwealth Games
Medallists at the 1986 Commonwealth Games